La Russa is an Italian surname.  Notable people with the surname include:

Adrienne La Russa (born 1948), American actress
Ignazio La Russa (born 1947), Italian politician
Romano Maria la Russa (born 1952), Italian politician
Tony La Russa (born 1944), American former baseball manager and player

Italian-language surnames